Bourhan Ahmad Muhammad Abro (born 30 May 1995) is a Djiboutian swimmer. He competed in the men's 50 metre freestyle event at the 2016 Summer Olympics, where he ranked 74th with a time of 27.13 seconds. He did not advance to the semifinals.

References

External links
 

1995 births
Living people
Djiboutian male swimmers
Olympic swimmers of Djibouti
Swimmers at the 2016 Summer Olympics
Place of birth missing (living people)